The 2021 NCAA Division I Men's Swimming and Diving Championships were contested from March 24–27, 2021 at the Greensboro Aquatic Center in Greensboro, North Carolina. It was the 97th annual NCAA-sanctioned swim meet to determine the team and individual national champions of Division I men's collegiate swimming and diving in the United States.

Team standings
Full results

Swimming results 
Full results

Diving results

See also
List of college swimming and diving teams

References

NCAA Division I Men's Swimming and Diving Championships
NCAA Division I Men's Swimming and Diving Championships
NCAA Division I Men's Swimming And Diving Championships
NCAA Division I Men's Swimming and Diving Championships